La Genétouze may refer to the following places in France:

La Genétouze, Charente-Maritime, a commune in the Charente-Maritime department
La Genétouze, Vendée, a commune in the Vendée department